Crimes of Passion is the fourth studio album by American duo Crocodiles. It was released on August 20, 2013, via Frenchkiss Records.

Track listing

References

2013 albums
Crocodiles (band) albums
Frenchkiss Records albums